Stephen Polyak (born  Stjepan Lucian Poljak; December 13, 1889 – March 9, 1955) was an American neuroanatomist and neurologist considered to be one of the most prominent neuroanatomists of the 20th century.

Polyak studied the functional structure of the organs of sight and hearing, explaining the function of the retina and the cochlea, and visual and auditory pathways and centers. He also gave a new interpretation of the basic visual processes.

Selected works

See also
Midget cell
Parasol cell

References

1889 births
1955 deaths
American neurologists
Austro-Hungarian military personnel of World War I
People with acquired American citizenship
Austrian emigrants to the United States
Croatian emigrants to the United States